Daniele Sgnaolin (born 22 November 1970) is an Italian former racing cyclist. He rode in the 1996 Giro d'Italia and the 1997 Tour de France.

Major results
1991
 2nd Trofeo Città di San Vendemiano
1995
 1st Stage 3 Giro delle Regioni
 2nd Overall Giro Ciclistico d'Italia
1st Stage 7

References

External links
 

1970 births
Living people
Italian male cyclists
People from San Donà di Piave
Cyclists from the Metropolitan City of Venice